Menahem Ben-Sasson (born 7 July 1951) is an Israeli politician and a former member of the Knesset for Kadima. Between 2009 and 2017 he was the president of Hebrew University of Jerusalem, succeeding Menachem Magidor.

Biography
Born in Jerusalem, Israel, Ben-Sasson served in a Nahal unit in Ein Tzurim and in the artillery section during his national service in the Israel Defense Forces. He went on to study at the Hebrew University of Jerusalem, where he gained a BA in History and philosophy and a PhD in the History of the Jewish People in the Islamic Lands.
 
Ben-Sasson lives in Jerusalem, and is married with three children. In addition to Hebrew, he speaks Arabic, English, French, and German.

Academic career
After doing a post-doctorate at the University of Cambridge, he became a professor of the History of the Jewish Nation. Between 1997 and 2001 he served as rector of the Hebrew University, and represented the Association of University Heads at Knesset committees. He has served on the board of directors at Yad Vashem, as president of the World Union of Jewish Studies, and is a vice-president of the Memorial Foundation for Jewish Culture. He was also a three-time fellow at the University of Pennsylvania's Katz Center for Advanced Judaic Studies.

Between 2009 and 2017 he was the president of Hebrew University of Jerusalem, succeeding Menachem Magidor. He was in turn succeeded by Asher Cohen.

Political career
Prior to the 2006 elections, Ben-Sasson was placed 20th on Kadima's list. With the party winning 29 seats, he entered the Knesset, and was appointed chairman of the Constitution, Law and Justice Committee. He also served as chairman of the Parliamentary Inquiry Committee on Wiretapping, and chairs the Lobby for Higher Education.

He lost his seat in the 2009 elections.

References

External links

Members of the 17th Knesset (2006–2009)
Hebrew University of Jerusalem alumni
Israeli historians
Israeli educators
Living people
1951 births
Kadima politicians
Academic staff of the Hebrew University of Jerusalem
Presidents of universities in Israel
Commanders Crosses of the Order of Merit of the Federal Republic of Germany